Puesto Cortaderas is an isolated basaltic pyroclastic cone in Neuquén Province, Argentina.

It is in the Andean Volcanic Belt.

See also
 List of volcanoes in Argentina

References
 

Volcanoes of Argentina
Andean Volcanic Belt
Volcanoes of Neuquén Province
Mountains of Argentina
Pyroclastic cones